Bush Doctor is the third studio album by Jamaican reggae singer Peter Tosh. It was released in 1978 on Rolling Stones Records. The album features Mick Jagger as guest vocalist on one song, while Keith Richards plays guitar on two tracks. The rhythm section featured Sly and Robbie.

Track listing
All tracks composed by Peter Tosh; except where indicated

Side 1
"(You Gotta Walk) Don't Look Back" (Smokey Robinson, Ronald White) - 3:43
"Pick Myself Up" - 3:55
"I'm the Toughest" - 3:48
"Soon Come" (Tosh, Bob Marley) - 3:54
"Moses - The Prophet" - 3:37

Side 2
"Bush Doctor" - 4:04
"Stand Firm" - 6:10
"Dem Ha Fe Get a Beatin'" - 4:11
"Creation" - 6:29

Bonus tracks on 2002 EMI Remaster

"Lesson in My Life" - (previously unreleased)
"Soon Come" - (long version)
"I'm the Toughest" - (long version)
"Bush Doctor" - (long version)
"(You Gotta Walk) Don't Look Back" (alternate version)
"Tough Rock Soft Stones" - (previously unreleased)

Personnel
Peter Tosh - rhythm and acoustic guitars, clavinet, audio harp, lead vocals
Robbie Shakespeare - bass, pick guitar, guitar, horn arrangements
Sly Dunbar - drums, gato box
Mikey "Mao" Chung - lead guitar, Moog synthesizer, Fender Rhodes, pick guitar
Robert Lyn - acoustic piano, organ, Fender Rhodes, clavinet
Keith Sterling - keyboards
Luther François - soprano saxophone
Donald Kinsey - lead guitar
Larry McDonald - percussion
Uziah "Sticky" Thompson - percussion
with:
Karl Pitterson - arrangement on "Creation"
Happy Traum - autoharp on "Creation"
Keith Richards - guitar on "Bush Doctor" and "Stand Firm"
Mick Jagger - vocals on "(You Gotta Walk) Don't Look Back"
Technical
The Glimmer Twins - executive producer
Errol Thompson, Geoffrey Chung, Lew Hahn - engineer

Charts

Sales and certifications

References

Peter Tosh albums
1978 albums
Albums produced by the Glimmer Twins
Rolling Stones Records albums
Albums produced by Sly and Robbie
Cannabis music